Transaction Capabilities Application Part, from ITU-T recommendations Q.771-Q.775 or ANSI T1.114 is a protocol for Signalling System 7 networks. Its primary purpose is to facilitate multiple concurrent dialogs between the same sub-systems on the same machines, using Transaction IDs to differentiate these, similar to the way TCP ports facilitate multiplexing connections between the same IP addresses on the Internet.

TCAP uses ASN.1 BER encoding, as well as the protocols it encapsulates, namely MAP in mobile phone networks or INAP in Intelligent Networks.

Overview

TCAP messages are sent over the wire between machines. TCAP primitives are sent between the application and the local TCAP stack. All TCAP messages are primitives but there are primitives that are not messages. In other words, some are only transferred inside the local machine. A TCAP primitive is made up of one or more TCAP components.

An ITU-T TCAP primitive may be one of the following types:

A Begin primitive has an Originating Transaction ID (up to 4 bytes). A Continue primitive has an Originating Transaction ID and a Destination Transaction ID. End and Abort primitives only have a Destination Transaction ID. Each primitive has both an optional component and (optional) dialogue portions. The component portion for the unidirectional primitive is mandatory.

The dialogue portion carries dialogue or unidialogue control PDUs. For MAP and INAP, dialogue PDU is used which performs establishment and release of dialogues for the application context provided in the primitives. Following primitives are defined for the dialogue PDU:

Each ITU-T TCAP component may be one of the following types:

Invoke components have a signed 7 bit InvokeID which is present in all the other components to identify which invoke they relate to.

TCAP is based on the OSI defined ROSE, Remote Operations Services Element protocol.

Transaction ID
The transaction ID is a TCAP reference for a set of TCAP operations that are performed within a single dialog. When machine A starts a TCAP dialog with another machine B, A sends a Begin message to B. This Begin message contains an Originating Transaction ID, which is the Transaction ID reference for A. When machine B replies to A with a Continue message, it includes A's Transaction ID as the Destination Transaction ID. Furthermore, B includes its own Transaction ID as the Originating Transaction ID.

As the TCAP dialog goes on, each Continue message includes the Transaction ID of the destination machine as the Destination Transaction ID and the Transaction ID of the originating machine as the Originating Transaction ID. When either machine wants to close the dialog, it sends an End message or an Abort message to the other machine. This message contains the Destination Transaction ID only.

Invoke ID
Invoke ID is a TCAP reference for a specific TCAP operation and must be unique within a dialog.

Decoded TCAP Message
This is a MO-SMS sent by a MAP layer and the hex stream is taken from TCAP layer.

   62 74 48 04 00 02 00 30 6B 1A 28 18 06 07 00 11 86 05 01 01 01 A0 0D 60 0B A1 09 06 07 04 00 00
   01 00 19 02 6C 50 A1 4E 02 01 01 02 01 2E 30 46 80 05 70 31 42 44 44 84 06 A1 70 91 92 55 55 04
   35 2F 09 00 70 97 92 62 23 04 00 90 20 11 80 01 24 00 27 43 50 7A 0E A2 A3 CB 20 71 79 4E 07 B1
   C3 EE 73 3D 7C 2E 83 D2 20 74 D8 5E 06 95 ED 65 39 68 5E 2E BB 01 00

According to tag length values, this can be decoded as below.       
       
       '--> 62|74  <- Start of Tcap begin message
              |
              '--> 48|04:00 02 00 30    <- Transaction ID
              |
              '--> 6B|1A   <- Start of Dialog  portion 
                     |
                     '--> 28|18
                            |
                            '--> 06|07:00 11 86 05 01 01 01 
                            |
                            '--> A0|0D
                                   |
                                   '--> 60|0B
                                          |
                                          '--> A1|09
                                                 |
                                                 '--> 06|07:04 00 00 01 00 19 02   <- Application context
              |
              '--> 6C|50     <- Start of component portion
                     |
                     '--> A1|4E
                            |
                            '--> 02|01:01    <- Component Id (invoke id)
                            |
                            '--> 02|01:2E    <- Operation Code
                            |
                            '--> 30|46       <- Start of parameter buffer
                                   |
                                   '--> 80|05:70 31 42 44 44        <- SM-RP-DA(BCD)
                                   |
                                   '--> 84|06:A1 70 91 92 55 55     <- SM-RP-OA(BCD)
                                   |
                                   '--> 04|35:2F 09 00 70 97 92 62 23 04 00 90 20 11 80 01 24 00 27 43 50 7A 0E A2 A3 CB 20 71 79 4E 07 B1 C3 EE 73 3D 7C 2E 83 D2 20 74 D8 5E 06 95 ED 65 39 68 5E 2E BB 01   <- SM-RP-UI

External links
 ITU Q.771: Functional description of transaction capabilities
 ITU Q.772: Transaction capabilities information element definitions
 ITU Q.773: Transaction capabilities formats and encoding
 ITU Q.774: Transaction capabilities procedures
 ITU Q.775: Guidelines for using transaction capabilities
 : TCAP ASN1 specification

Signaling System 7
ITU-T recommendations
Telecommunication protocols